Sen Rai is an Indian boxer. He competed in the men's featherweight event at the 1976 Summer Olympics. He won his first bout by walkover, but lost his subsequent fight to Ángel Herrera Vera of Cuba.

References

Year of birth missing (living people)
Living people
Indian male boxers
Olympic boxers of India
Boxers at the 1976 Summer Olympics
Place of birth missing (living people)
Featherweight boxers